Judith Harris may refer to:

 Judith Rich Harris (1918-2018), psychology researcher and author
 Judith Harris, American poet and author
Judith Lynette Harris, Senior UX/UI and Graphic Designer